Atsushi Yamaguchi may refer to:

 Atsushi Yamaguchi (footballer), Japanese footballer (born 1980)
 Atsushi Yamaguchi (judge) (born 1953)